The Jabiru 3300 is a lightweight four-stroke, horizontally opposed "flat-six" air-cooled aircraft engine produced by Jabiru Aircraft. The engines are direct drive and  fitted with alternators, silencers, vacuum pump drives and dual ignition systems as standard. The engine is used to power homebuilt and ultralight aircraft.

History

Jabiru Aircraft began as a builder of small two-seater aircraft in Bundaberg, Australia. It turned to producing its own engines when supplies of the Italian-sourced engines previously used dried up. Jabiru engines are designed to be manufactured in small batch quantities, so the firm uses CNC machines to mill major engine parts such as cylinder blocks and heads, rather than using cast items. The 3300 is a modular development of Jabiru's flat-four 2200 engine.

In November 2014, the Australian Civil Aviation Safety Authority proposed restricting all Jabiru-powered aircraft to day-visual flight rules only, without passengers or solo students and within gliding distance of a safe place to land due to the engine line's safety record. This was in response to 46 reports of engine failure in flight. In-flight failure modes included, but were not limited to: fuel starvation; valve/port collapse & breakage of critical bolts. Both the manufacturer and Recreational Aviation Australia opposed the restrictions as unnecessary and unwarranted. The final rule adopted somewhat softened the restrictions, allowing the carriage of passengers and students, but requiring them to sign an acknowledgement of risk before flying and restricting equipped aircraft to day VFR flight and within gliding distance of a safe place to land.

A subsequent tear-down of one engine by CASA resulted in recommendations in June 2016 for further easing of the restrictions.

Applications

Specifications

See also
 Jabiru 2200
 CAMit 3300
 List of aircraft engines
Comparable engines:
 Continental O-200
 D-Motor LF39
 Lycoming IO-233
 Sauer S 2100 ULT
 ULPower UL390i

References

 Jabiru Aircraft: 6 Cylinder Engine
 JABIRU 3300cc AIRCRAFT ENGINE

Boxer engines
1990s aircraft piston engines
Jabiru aircraft engines